Tune up may refer to:

 Service (motor vehicle)
 "Tune Up", a Miles Davis jazz standard
 Tune-Up!, a 1972 album by Sonny Rollins
 Tune Up! (album), an album by Don Patterson

See also
Tuning (disambiguation)